The island nation of Grenada is the smallest country in the Western Hemisphere. A sovereign state that is located in the West Indies in the Caribbean Sea towards the southern end of the Grenadine island chain, the nation is composed of the island Grenada along with six smaller islands that lie north of it. Grenada is known as the "Isle of Spice" for its production of nutmeg and mace crops (the nutmeg even being featured on the nation's official flag), for which it is one of the world's largest exporters and contributes vastly to the country's GDP. Grenada is a developing country that relies heavily on the support of other nations and organizations to finance many of its government projects. One of Grenada's partners is the International Monetary Fund.

Relations with the International Monetary Fund 
The nation of Grenada joined the International Monetary Fund (IMF) on August 27, 1975. Since then, Grenada has been under heavy review with the IMF, who have made Grenada eligible for special drawing rights. Special drawing rights (abbreviated SDR) are supplementary foreign exchange reserve assets defined and maintained by the IMF. Based on Grenada's performances, both economically and policy wise, Grenada can be eligible for more SDRs. In the previous years, Grenada and the IMF have been working closely to grow and sustain their economy.

History of Lending 

Grenada and the IMF have been lending since September 29, 1975.

Economic Overview of Grenada 
The economy of Grenada is small and tourism is its largest foreign exchange earner. Grenada shares a common central bank with Organisation of Eastern Caribbean States (OECS), and holds the East Caribbean dollars as its currency. After tourism, Grenada relies heavily on agricultural exports, mainly different types of spices. The nutmeg, wheat flours, and various fruits makes up majority of Grenada's exports (per 2017). Grenada has suffered many economic drawbacks since becoming a nation. A major concern is the rising fiscal deficit and a heavy debt crippling its government operations. Hurricane Ivan in 2004 led to serious setbacks for Grenada, along with the Great Recession in 2008 as the United States of America is one of Grenada's largest trade partners. Grenada was listed nine spaces above the bottom when it came to total debt in 126 developing countries in 2017.

2019 Article IV Consultation with Grenada 
The most recent publishing of the Article IV Consultation conducted by the IMF showed some favorable reviews towards Grenada. The press release shows great progress for Grenada: including a GDP growth of 3.1% and Quota (SDR) of 16.4 million. The IMF notes that the increase of GDP productivity through construction projects and tourism. Grenada has also been able to keep inflation low and bank credit positive. One negative mark noted was that unemployment, although declining, still remains high at 21.7%. A statement from the Executive Board Statement states:"... welcomed Grenada’s continued strong economic and fiscal performance and sustained debt reduction, underpinned by sound policies. They emphasized that further policy improvements and public support for reforms are critical to achieve higher and broad-based medium-term growth, further reduce unemployment, entrench debt sustainability, and strengthen financial stability."Grenada has also pushed to focus its concerns on the growing worry of climate change. The destruction brought on upon by Hurricane Ivan was devastating, but with the more powerful natural disasters accruing due to the warming of Earth's atmosphere, Grenada could quite possible be destroyed or even underwater. Much actions are being taken place to counteract the effects of climate change that are seen in the policies Grenada has been implementing this year.

References

Economy of Grenada
International Monetary Fund relations